Baker City Municipal Airport  is three miles north of Baker City, in Baker County, Oregon, United States. The National Plan of Integrated Airport Systems for 2011–2015 categorized it as a general aviation facility.

The first airline flights were Empire Airlines Boeing 247Ds in late 1946; successors West Coast, Air West and Hughes Airwest served Baker until 1973.

Facilities
The airport covers 398 acres (161 ha) at an elevation of 3,373 feet (1,028 m). It has three asphalt runways: 13/31 is 5,095 by 100 feet (1,553 x 30 m); 17/35 is 4,359 by 75 feet (1,329 x 23 m); 8/26 is 3,670 by 140 feet (1,119 x 43 m).

In the year ending July 13, 2010 the airport had 16,200 aircraft operations, average 44 per day: 77% general aviation, 22% air taxi, and 1% military. 37 aircraft were then based at the airport: 76% single-engine, 3% multi-engine, 8% helicopter, and 14% ultralight.

References

External links 
 Airport page at Baker City website
 Baker Aircraft, the fixed-base operator (FBO)
 Aerial image as of May 1994 from USGS The National Map
 

Airports in Baker County, Oregon
Buildings and structures in Baker City, Oregon